Girl in the Cadillac is a crime drama film released in 1995. The film stars Erika Eleniak and William McNamara.

Film synopsis
A woman called Mandy (Eleniak) runs away from her home. At a bus station she meets Rick (McNamara), who takes her with him to a rendezvous with a pair of bank robbers. After listening to their plan, Mandy agrees to drive the getaway car for $5,000, when they convince her everything will go smoothly. However, the robbery goes awry resulting in several bank employees killed, and Mandy flees with Rick and $75,000. As a result, she is chased by the police and the other two robbers. During their escape, Mandy and Rick buy a red Cadillac convertible. Ultimately, she decides she wants to give the money back, but Rick disagrees.

Filming
The film was shot in locations in Bakersfield and Los Angeles, California, and Corpus Christi, Texas.

Cast
Erika Eleniak as Mandy 
William McNamara as Rick
Michael Lerner as Pal
Bud Cort as Bud
Valerie Perrine as Tilly
William Shockley as Lamar
Leland Orser as Used car salesman

External links

1995 films
Films based on works by James M. Cain
1990s English-language films
Films scored by Anton Sanko